the following is a list of flags and banners used in Qatar

National Flag

Air Force Flag

Historical Flags

Sasanian Empire

Under Arab Rule

Jabrids

Portuguese Empire

Ottoman Empire

Omani Empire

Under Bahrain

Emirate of Diriyah

Pre-British Qatar

British Qatar

See also 

 Flag of Qatar
 Emblem of Qatar

References 

Lists and galleries of flags
Flags